Conventicle Act may refer to: 

 English Acts of Parliament:
 Conventicle Act 1664
 Conventicles Act 1670
 Conventicle Act (Sweden), in effect 1726–1858 in Sweden and until 1870 in Finland
 Conventicle Act (Denmark–Norway); in effect 1741–1848 in Denmark and until 1842 in Norway

See also
 Religion Act 1592, in England